Brainchild was a Youngstown, Ohio-based supergroup formed in 1969. Original members consisted of vocalist Joe Pizzulo, guitarist Larry Paxton, bassist Bill Bodine, drummer John Grazier, and keyboardists Ronny Lee and Danny Marshall. Later members were vocalist/drummer Dave Freeland, and vocalist "Odie" Crook. They disbanded at the end of 1972.

Keyboardist Ronny Lee would later join another group from Youngstown called Law, who would become the opening act for The Who.

Vocalist Joe Pizzulo went on to achieve massive success in the early/mid-1980s as a member of Sergio Mendes' band, providing lead vocals on the smash hits "Never Gonna Let You Go" and "Alibis," among others.
 
Nearly 30 years after their break up Brainchild members reunited in 2002 for a series of charity concerts.

References

External links
 Brainchild reunion website

Musical groups from Ohio
American progressive rock groups